Cacostola is a genus of longhorn beetles of the subfamily Lamiinae, containing the following species:

 Cacostola acuticauda Marinoni & Martins, 1982
 Cacostola apyraiuba Martins & Galileo, 2008
 Cacostola bimaculata Martins, Galileo & de Oliveira, 2009
 Cacostola brasiliensis Thomson, 1868
 Cacostola cana Marinoni & Martins, 1982
 Cacostola clorinda Dillon & Dillon, 1946
 Cacostola colombiana Martins & Galileo, 1999
 Cacostola flexicornis Bates, 1865
 Cacostola fusca Thomson, 1868
 Cacostola fuscata Dillon & Dillon, 1952
 Cacostola gracilis Marinoni & Martins, 1982
 Cacostola grisea Dillon & Dillon, 1946
 Cacostola janzeni Chemsak & Linsley, 1986
 Cacostola leonensis Dillon & Dillon, 1946
 Cacostola lineata (Hamilton in Leng & Hamilton, 1896)
 Cacostola mexicana (Breuning, 1943)
 Cacostola nelsoni Chemsak & Linsley, 1986
 Cacostola nordestina Martins & Galileo, 1999
 Cacostola obliquata Martins & Galileo, 1995
 Cacostola ornata Fleutiaux & Sallé, 1899
 Cacostola parafusca Martins, Galileo & de Oliveira, 2009
 Cacostola rugicollis Bates, 1885
 Cacostola salicicola (Linsley, 1934)
 Cacostola simplex (Pascoe, 1859)
 Cacostola sirena Dillon & Dillon, 1946
 Cacostola strandi (Breuning, 1943)
 Cacostola sulcipennis Melzer, 1934
 Cacostola vagelineata Fairmaire & Germain, 1859
 Cacostola vanini Martins, 1979
 Cacostola variegata Dillon & Dillon, 1946
 Cacostola volvula (Fabricius, 1781)
 Cacostola zanoa Dillon & Dillon, 1946

References

 
Onciderini